German submarine U-366 was a Type VIIC U-boat of Nazi Germany's Kriegsmarine during World War II.

She carried out two patrols. She did not sink or damage any ships.

She was a member of three wolfpacks.

She was sunk by a British aircraft, Swordfish "F" of 816 Squadron FAA, northwest of Hammerfest on 5 March 1944.

Design
German Type VIIC submarines were preceded by the shorter Type VIIB submarines. U-366 had a displacement of  when at the surface and  while submerged. She had two shafts and two  propellers.

U-366 was fitted with five  torpedo tubes (four fitted at the bow and one at the stern), fourteen torpedoes, one  SK C/35 naval gun, 220 rounds, and two twin  C/30 anti-aircraft guns. The boat had a complement of between forty-four and sixty.

Service history
The submarine was laid down on 22 May 1942 at the Flensburger Schiffbau-Gesellschaft yard at Flensburg as yard number 485, launched on 16 April 1943 and commissioned on 16 July under the command of Oberleutnant zur See Bruno Langenberg.

She served with the 5th U-boat Flotilla from 16 July 1943 and the 13th flotilla from 1 March 1944.

The boat was moved from Kiel in Germany to Bergen in Norway in February 1944.

First patrol
U-359s first patrol took her from Bergen to Hammerfest, along the Norwegian coastline, also in February.

Second patrol and loss
During another move from Hammerfest, she was attacked and sunk on 5 March 1944 by rockets fired from a Fairey Swordfish of 816 Naval Air Squadron, FAA (Fleet Air Arm). The aircraft had flown from the escort carrier .

50 men died in the U-boat; there were no survivors.

Wolfpacks
U-366 took part in three wolfpacks, namely:
 Hartmut (23 – 28 February 1944)
 Boreas (4 – 5 March 1944)
 Orkan (5 March 1944)

References

Bibliography

External links

German Type VIIC submarines
U-boats commissioned in 1943
U-boats sunk in 1944
1943 ships
U-boats sunk by British aircraft
Ships built in Flensburg
Ships lost with all hands
World War II submarines of Germany
World War II shipwrecks in the Arctic Ocean
Maritime incidents in March 1944